Amandine Bouillot (born 14 March 1984, Nancy, France), is a French athlete who competes in compound archery. She has represented the French national team since 2006. Her achievements include gold medals at the 2005 Summer Universiade and 2006 World University Championships, individual medals at the two major World Archery compound events the World Archery Championships and World Cup, and becoming the world number one ranked archer in May 2008.

References

1984 births
Living people
French female archers
World Archery Championships medalists
Universiade medalists in archery
Universiade gold medalists for France
Medalists at the 2005 Summer Universiade
21st-century French women